This is a list of post-nominal letters used throughout Malaysia by alphabetical order, compiled from the individual post-nominal letters pages (see below). The order in which they follow an individual's name is the same as the order of precedence for the wearing of order insignias, decorations, and medals. When applicable, non-hereditary titles are indicated.

A

B

D

G

H

J

K

P

S 

A
Post-nominal letters, Listed by alphabetical order
.